Hawaii Film Studio, owned by the State of Hawaii's Film Office, is the first film and television studio in Hawaii and is the first state-owned film and television studio in the United States.

History 
In 1975, CBS Productions leased 4.8 acres of land from the University of Hawaii at Manoa for the television series Hawaii Five-O. The land was part of the 52 acres that the University of Hawaii's Board of Regents had acquired from the former Fort Ruger in 1974. The Hawaii State Legislature later transferred control of the property to the Hawaii State Department of Business, Economic Development and Tourism. From 1980 to 1988, it was the home for Magnum, P.I.. In the late 1980s, the studio expanded to 7.5 acres. In the early 1990s, a sound stage was added.

The Hawaii Film Studio was the home for Jake and the Fatman, Raven, The Byrds of Paradise, One West Waikiki, Baywatch Hawaii, Hawaii, North Shore, Lost, The River, and Last Resort; movies-of-the-week; episodic television shows such as Beverly Hills 90210 and ER (Africa episodes); documentaries; commercials; and feature films such as Final Fantasy, Blue Crush, Tears of the Sun, The Rundown, and 50 First Dates. As of December 2017, the studio is currently the home to the new Hawaii Five-0.

The studio began undergoing renovations in 2014. In 2015 the cottages where props and costumes are stored were replaced. In 2017, $3.3 million was spent on the next phase of the renovation.

References

Notes

External links 

 Official website

Film studios
Cinema of Hawaii